Protekon performs maintenance and development services for the ports, railways and terminals of South Africa's state-owned transportation giant Transnet.  It is similar in function to the company Transnet Engineering, which performs maintenance and development for the rolling stock of Transnet's railways divisions.

External links
Protekon
Protekon 2006 Operational Report at Transnet

Transnet
Transport operators of South Africa